Danny Lee (born 17 February 1965) is an Australian former rugby league footballer. He also played a stint later in his career at Gateshead Thunder in England.

Playing career
Danny Lee, was born in Lismore, 1965. An uncompromising defender, Lee sparked interest from his future club when he represented Country Firsts in 1987 whilst playing for Lismore Marist Brothers. Lee joined the Cronulla Sutherland Sharks the following year making his first grade debut coming off the bench in the round 18 win against the Gold Coast/Tweed Heads Giants. Lee would go onto play a further 6 games that year winning the minor premiership and started in the preliminary final loss to the Balmain Tigers 9-2. 

Over the next 10 seasons, Lee would go onto play 212 games for the Sharks, the fifth most games for the club. 

Lee enjoyed an excellent run of success between 1995 and 1997 including; 1995 saw him being recognised as the Dally M prop of the year made particularly noteworthy due to Ian Roberts and Paul Harragon winning the award in 94 and 96 respectfully; 1996 saw another preliminary final loss and selection in the 1996 NSW Country team steered by Andrew Johns and Captain Laurie Daley which defeated the Brad Fittler led NSW City team 18-16; (Super League) 1997 was arguably his greatest year which saw his NSW debut in the Super League Tri Series, selection on the Super League Australian tour of Great Britain (without playing a game) and a grand final appearance in the 26 – 8 loss to the Brisbane Broncos.  

Lee finished his career playing 1 season in the English Super League with Gateshead Thunder which in turn was their only sonly season as a club.

References

Sources
Danny Lee at sharksforever.com
Danny Lee at nrlstats.com
Danny Lee at stats.rleague.com
Lee brings the beach life to Thunder road - article at The Independent (London)

1965 births
Living people
Australian rugby league players
Country New South Wales Origin rugby league team players
Cronulla-Sutherland Sharks players
Gateshead Thunder (1999) players
New South Wales rugby league team players
Rugby league players from Lismore, New South Wales
Rugby league props